This article lists plants referenced in The Bible, ordered alphabetically by English common/colloquial name. For plants whose identities are unconfirmed or debated the most probable species is listed first. Plants named in the Old Testament (Hebrew Bible or Tenakh) are given with their Hebrew name, while those mentioned in the New Testament are given with their Greek names.

A

B–E

F–I

J–M

N–R

S

T–Z

Notes

References

Sources
 
 Post, G.E. Bible Dictionary Contributions
 Zohary, Michael (1982) Plants of the Bible. New York: Cambridge University Press.

External links
 All of the Plants of the Bible
 Biblical Gardens
 Plants of the Bible, Missouri Botanical Garden
 Project "Bibelgarten im Karton" (biblical garden in a cardboard box) of a social and therapeutic horticultural group (handicapped persons) named "Flowerpower" from Germany
 List of biblical gardens in Europe
 
 Biblical Botanical Gardens Society USA

Bible
Plants